The family of Robert Holborne of Harwich have, with a few exceptions, been involved in shipbuilding for centuries, continuing up until the 1930s. The earliest chronological reference found for any shipwright bearing the name ‘Holb(o/u)rn(e)’ is that of Robert Holborn who was granted Letters Patent in 1543, along with Peter Pett and others skillful in shipbuilding. The authority for these letters patent was not by the usual Writ of Privy Seal, but Per Ipsum Regent, i.e., by "direct motion of the King," Henry VIII. 

Shipwrights were granted direct employment by the Crown. The first list of Master Shipwrights appointed by Patent by Henry VIII included John Smyth, Robert Holborn, Richard Bull, James Baker (father of Mathew Baker) and Peter Pett. On 23 April 1548, Robert Holborn, Smyth and Bull received similar patents, and it was added that, as shipwrights, they should instruct others, by reason of their long and good service.

Shipwrights were in high demand during the 16th century, and sometimes many members of the same family engaged in the trade, such as the Pett family. Robert Holborn appears also to have come from a family of shipwrights. Early family wills place him among the Holborns of Erith, and he was likely an uncle or father to Richard Hoborn of Chatham.

reference : Elizabethan Ship by Gregory Robinson (Paperback 1964) Then and There Series.

Year of birth missing
Year of death missing
English shipwrights